Professor Brian Laidlaw Goodlet (13 March 1903 – 27 October 1961) was a British electrical engineer. He was instrumental in the beginnings of nuclear energy in the UK.

Early life
He was born in Saint Petersburg in the Russian Empire, where he attended the Imperial School. He left Russia in 1918, shortly after the revolution, when he had to fight his way
down the Nevsky Prospect in order to board a train to Archangel where he and his parents spent two years in a refugee camp before being able to land in Britain. On arrival he was offered a job either as a clerk in a bank or an engineering apprentice in Sheffield. He chose the latter. He moved to Metropolitan Vickers in Manchester where he was put in charge of their high voltage laboratory at the age of 25. 
Aged 27 he studied Engineering at Cambridge for two years.

Career
He worked with Thomas Alibone and John Cockcroft

In 1937 he took up the chair of the engineering school at Cape Town University. Whilst there he published his book "Basic Electrotechnics" which became standard reading at many universities

Harwell
In 1950 he was head hunted by Sir John Cockcroft to become head of the Engineering Research and Development Division at the Atomic Energy Research Establishment in Oxfordshire.

He left Harwell on 1 April 1956, and moved to Leicestershire.

Personal life
He married Norah McCormick in 1932, and they had two sons and two daughters. His wife was the daughter of the vicar of Broadclyst in Devon.

He died on 27 October 1961 at his home in Quorn, Leicestershire, aged 58, and is buried in the village church.

References

 An Atomic Empire: A Technical History of the Rise and Fall of the British Atomic Energy Programme

1903 births
1961 deaths
British electrical engineers
British nuclear engineers
People from Quorn, Leicestershire
White Russian emigrants to the United Kingdom